Jacques Achille Marie Euzéby (August 11, 1920 – April 16, 2010) was a French parasitologist, born on  in Bagnols-sur-Cèze.

Euzéby specialized in the study of parasites (including fungi) and parasitic diseases. Euzéby was granted the Emile Brumpt Award and the WAAVP Award.

References

1920 births
2010 deaths
People from Bagnols-sur-Cèze
French parasitologists